Dennis Horner (birth unknown), was a professional rugby league footballer who played in the 1940s and 1950s.

Playing career

County Cup Final appearances
Dennis Horner played  in Wakefield Trinity's 17-3 victory over Keighley in the 1951 Yorkshire County Cup Final during the 1951–52 season at Fartown Ground, Huddersfield on Saturday 27 October 1951.

Notable tour matches
Dennis Horner played in Wakefield Trinity's match against Australia during the 1952–53 Kangaroo tour of Great Britain and France at Belle Vue, Wakefield in 1952.

References

External links
Search for "Horner" at rugbyleagueproject.org

1920s births
1978 deaths
English rugby league players
Place of birth missing
Rugby league hookers
Wakefield Trinity players